Jamarch-e Bala  is a village in the north-eastern Badakhshan Province of Afghanistan, serving as the capital of Maimay District. It is located on the Panj River near the Vanj River.

It lies almost exactly on the Tajikistan border where it is connected via the M41 highway.

See also
Valleys of Afghanistan
Tourism in Afghanistan

References

Populated places in Maimay District